Yahoo Boy No Laptop Nation, popularly known as YBNL Nation or simply YBNL, is an independent record label founded by Olamide in 2012.

History
On 19 February 2020, YBNL Nation signed a distribution, and publishing deal with Empire Distribution.

Artists

Current acts
Fireboy DML
B.Banks
Asake
Jayboi
DJ Enimoney
Senth

Former acts

Lil Kesh
Viktoh
Chinko Ekun
Adekunle Gold
Xino
Davolee
Lyta
Picazo Rhap
Pelepele (deceased)
Limerick
Yomi blaze
Temmie Ovwasa

Producers
 Pheelz
 Young Jonn
 B-Banks
 Vinkihill
 Pprime
 Multibeatz

Releases

Awards and nominations

References

Nigerian record labels
Record labels established in 2012
Music production companies
YBNL Nation